Valencia or Valancia Town, is a housing estate located within union council 144 (Haloke) in the administrative town of Nishtar in Lahore, Punjab, Pakistan. Conceived by Manzoor Ahmed, Valencia was first planned in the 1990s and construction began by PECHS through funding from Mashreq Bank. The 2000 property boom in Lahore helped populate Valencia. The housing estate is known for its well-landscaped boulevards connecting a balanced mix of single-family detached homes, community and shopping centres. It is named after the city Valencia, Spain.

Blocks
Valencia is divided into blocks, which each block consisting of a dedicated greenspace and playground. Defence Road and Khyaban-e-Jinnah serve as the main entry/exit points of Valancia.

Location
Valencia is a peaceful and quiet suburban locality located on the outers of NFC Housing Society and WAPDA Town.

Infrastructure

Facilities 
 Independent water supply
 Sewage & garbage disposal
 Independent filtration plants
 Society's own security
 Fiber to home service

Amenities 
 Valencia Central Mosque
 Valencia Community Centre
 Valencia Football Club
 Valencia Horse & Riding Club
 Valencia Cricket Club
 Valencia Amusement Parks
 Aashiyana Cycling Club

Communication
Telecommunication services are provided by all major telecom companies in Lahore. PTCL is the major landline and wireless local loop provider as well as WorldCom and BrainTel. Cable TV is provided by local operators in the community. Internet and broadband services are provided by Ptcl and storm fiber. In 2018 stormfiber and PTCL have launched their GPON services in Valencia.

Masjid
A grand Valancia Central Masjid is situated in the center of Valancia. It is located near to Valancia Community Centre and cater for religious needs of the local residents.

Homes

In addition to residential plots for development by the owners and developers, PECHS has developed constructed ready to move Valencia Homes on 5, 10 and 15 marla plots and are custom designed for expatriate Pakistanis living presently in the Middle East, USA, UK and Europe. These are elegantly designed two-floor housing units offers affordable housing.

Banks
Following banks branches are present in Valancia:
Faysal Bank
MCB Bank
Habib Metropolitan Bank
UBL
Sindh Bank
Meezan Bank
Askari Commercial Bank
Habib Bank Limited
Bank Al Habib
Dubai Islamic Bank
Bank Islami
Allied Bank
National Bank
Bank of Punjab

Healthcare
The nearest major hospital is Shaukat Khanum Memorial Cancer Hospital & Research Centre built by cricketer turned politician Imran Khan and Jinnah Hospital. Local clinics include:
 Evercare Hospital
 Hameeda Memorial Hospital 
 Rehana Mushtaq Clinic
 Oral Square (A complete family and cosmetic dentistry)

Education
Major schools in Valencia and in surrounding area include:
Beaconhouse Valencia
 Dar-e-arqam School
The Educators Valencia 
Misber College
Academia De Avoures
American Lycetuff
The Smart School
Lahore Grammar School
 Mian Grammar International School

Transport

Other modes of commuting remain private cars, Rikshaw, bikes

See also
Wapda Town
Johar Town
Lahore

External links

Valencia Developer PECHS official site
Lahore Property Prices Largely Stagnant Over the Past 5 Years - Lahore Real Estate News published in Express Tribune.

References

Nishtar Town